Stuart Brian Tinney, OAM (born 7 December 1964 in Mundubbera) is an Olympic-level equestrian rider, who competes for Australia. He won a team gold medal at the 2000 Summer Olympics, a team bronze medal at the 2016 Summer Olympics, and also competed at the 2004 Summer Olympics.

Tinney competed at four World Equestrian Games (in 1998, 2002, 2010 and 2014). He finished 4th in the team eventing competition at the 2002 World Games. His best individual placement is 8th place from 2010.

In 2008, Tinney competed in Europe in an attempt to make selection for the Beijing Olympics, but did not make the Australian team. In 2009, Tinney won the Olympic level CCI**** class at the Australian International 3 day event with Vettori. He also came 7th with Ari de Gwaihier. The Australian International 3 day event is one of only 6 CCI**** competitions in the world and the only one on the Southern Hemisphere.

After 12 years of absence, Tinney made his Olympic return in 2016, when he won a team bronze medal and placed 22nd individually.

Tinney received an Australian Sports Medal and a Medal of the Order of Australia in 2001 for his 2000 gold medal. He was inducted into the Sport Australia Hall of Fame in 2003.

Notable Horses 

 Jeepster – 1987 Bay Gelding
 1998 World Equestrian Games – Individual Ninth Place
 2000 Sydney Olympics – Team Gold Medal
 2004 Athens Olympics – Team Sixth Place, Individual 38th Place
 Ava – 1992 Bay Mare (Aachen)
 2002 World Equestrian Games – Team Fourth Place, Individual 16th Place
 Vettori – 1996 Gray Warmblood Cross Gelding (Voltaire)
 2009 Adelaide CCI**** Winner
 2010 World Equestrian Games – Individual Eighth Place
 Panamera – 1999 Bay Warmblood Mare (Staccato x Lunchtime)
 2011 Adelaide CCI****Winner
 Pluto Mio – 1998 Gray Hanoverian/Thoroughbred Gelding (Daley K x Al Mundhir)
 2014 World Equestrian Games – Individual 11th Place
 2016 Rio Olympics – Team Bronze Medal, Individual 22nd Place

References

External links
 Official site

1964 births
Living people
Olympic equestrians of Australia
Australian male equestrians
Olympic gold medalists for Australia
Olympic bronze medalists for Australia
Equestrians at the 2000 Summer Olympics
Equestrians at the 2004 Summer Olympics
Equestrians at the 2016 Summer Olympics
Australian event riders
Olympic medalists in equestrian
Recipients of the Medal of the Order of Australia
Recipients of the Australian Sports Medal
Sport Australia Hall of Fame inductees
Medalists at the 2000 Summer Olympics
Medalists at the 2016 Summer Olympics
21st-century Australian people